Maksym Anatoliyovych Levytskyi (born 26 November 1972) is a retired Ukrainian footballer who played as a goalkeeper.

Club career
In January 2001, Levytskyi was involved in a fake passport scandal in which he used a purported Greek passport to play for French Ligue 1 club AS Saint-Étienne as a European Union citizen; Brazilian teammate Alex Dias used a fake Portuguese passport. The pair were given four-month bans with two more months suspended, and Saint-Étienne were deducted seven points, leading to their relegation.

International career 
In 2009, Levytskyi committed to be a part of the 2009 Maccabiah Games football squad representing Russia. When the match dates conflicted with league play, Levytskyi pulled from the squad.

Honours
 Russian Premier League champion: 2001.
 Russian Premier League bronze: 2002.
 Russian Cup winner: 2003 (played for FC Spartak Moscow in the early stages of the 2002/03 competition).

European club competitions
With FC Spartak Moscow.

 UEFA Champions League 2001–02: 4 games.
 UEFA Champions League 2002–03: 3 games.

Footnotes

External links

Profile

 Ukraine - Record International Players

1972 births
Ukrainian Jews
Jewish footballers
Living people
People from Shakhty
Ukrainian footballers
Ukraine international footballers
SC Tavriya Simferopol players
FC Chernomorets Novorossiysk players
AS Saint-Étienne players
FC Spartak Moscow players
FC Dynamo Moscow players
FC Rostov players
FC Akhmat Grozny players
Ligue 1 players
Ukrainian expatriate footballers
Russian Premier League players
Ukrainian Premier League players
FC Sibir Novosibirsk players
Expatriate footballers in France
Expatriate footballers in Russia
Ukrainian expatriate sportspeople in France
Ukrainian expatriate sportspeople in Russia
Association football goalkeepers
Sportspeople from Rostov Oblast